The 2021–22 Danish Women's League, also known as Gjensidige Kvindeligaen, is the 50th season of the highest women's football league in Denmark and is currently contested by 8 teams each year in Denmark. HB Køge are the defending champions, as they took their first title in May 2021.

Gjensidige is the current main sponsor for the league, since July 2019.

Teams

Personnel and kits

Managerial changes

Results

Main round
Teams played each other twice. Top six advanced to the championship round.

Championship round
Goals and points were transferred from the main round in full.

Relegation round

Top scorers
Goals scored in the main and championship rounds are counted.

Regular season

Player of the Month

References

External links
 Stillinger og resultater dbu.dk
 Summary - Elitedivisionen on soccerway.com

2019-20
2021–22 domestic women's association football leagues
2021–22 in Danish football